Jyotish Das (born 6 January 1973) is an Indian former cricketer. He played one first-class match for Bengal in 1999/00.

See also
 List of Bengal cricketers

References

External links
 

1973 births
Living people
Indian cricketers
Bengal cricketers
People from Hooghly district